Ludwig Kronfuß (born 16 July 1950) is an Austrian speed skater. He competed in two events at the 1976 Winter Olympics.

References

1950 births
Living people
Austrian male speed skaters
Olympic speed skaters of Austria
Speed skaters at the 1976 Winter Olympics
Sportspeople from Vienna